Sergio Cabrera may refer to:

 Sergio Cabrera (director), Colombian film director
 Sergio Cabrera (swimmer), Paraguayan swimmer